Albert Schou (27 March 1849, ? – 4 February 1900, Copenhagen) was a Danish photographer.

Biography 
He was a retired lieutenant, working as a clerk for a bookseller when, in 1867, he joined with the photographer Georg Emil Hansen and his brother, the painter Niels Christian Hansen to open a photography studio which, with the addition of Clemens Weller (a bookbinder) in 1869, became the firm of Hansen, Schou & Weller.

By 1883, there were already newspaper advertisements promoting him as freelance photographer, with a studio on Holmens Kanal. He left the firm in 1885 and, two years later, opened his own studio, on Købmagergade, which he operated until 1898. Some of his photographs also bear addresses near the Tivoli Gardens and Vesterbrogade. 

His son, "Albert Schou jr." (Albert Christian Ludvig Max Schou, 1878-1944) was also a photographer and continued his father's business, having already operated his own studio on Frederiksborggade. In 1893, he had won a silver medal at the World's Columbian Exposition in Chicago.

Sources 
 Bjørn Ochsner: "Albert Schou", in: Fotografer i og fra Danmark indtil år 1900, Vol. 2, Det Kongelige Bibliotek, 1996 
 Dansk Fotografihistorie, Mette Sandbye (Ed.). Gyldendal, Copenhagen 2004,

External links

 Albert Schou @ History of Photography

1849 births
1900 deaths
Danish photographers
Place of birth unknown